The 1991 Rome summit was the 12th NATO summit bringing the leaders of member nations together at the same time.  The formal sessions and informal meetings in Rome, Italy took place on 7–8 November 1991.

Background
The United States, with Germany's support, proposed reconfiguring NATO's military.  The military planners projections contemplated an emphasis smaller, highly mobile forces geared for fast reaction to an array of potential contingencies other than the defense of Western Europe against a conventional large-force assault.  The re-constituted NATO-assets would be flexibly available for a broadly defined range of NATO-directed missions.  The unanimous agreement with the essentials of these proposed changes was officially confirmed at the Rome summit. Although the French joined in principle in agreeing to the reformation of NATO's military, this did not signal that France would re-join NATO's military structure.

Accomplishments
The Alliance's New Strategic Concept was published on the first day of the summit.

The Rome Declaration on Peace and Cooperation was issued on the second day of the summit.

Notes

References
 Brenner, Michael J. (1998).  Terms of engagement: the United States and the European Security Identity. Westport, Connecticut: Greenwood Publishing. ; 
 Cogan, Charles. (2001).  The third option: the Emancipation of European Defense, 1989–2000. Westport, Connecticut: Greenwood Publishing.

External links
  NATO update, 1991

Summit of 1991
1991 Rome summit
1991 in politics
1991 in Italy
Diplomatic conferences in Italy
20th-century diplomatic conferences
1991 in international relations
1991 conferences
Italy and NATO
November 1991 events in Europe
Events in Rome